Iowa Western Community College is a public community college in Council Bluffs, Iowa. It was founded in 1967 and offers 84 programs in both vocational and technical areas as well as in liberal arts. It is also home to a flight school.

Campus 
Aside from the main campus in Council Bluffs, the college has expanded into other parts of the district with the establishment of centers in Atlantic (Cass County Center), Harlan (Shelby County Center), Shenandoah (Page/Fremont County Center) and Clarinda (Clarinda Center). In late 2021, Iowa Western's trustees approved a new campus to serve students in adjacent Harrison County through a new career academy in Missouri Valley.

Academics 
Iowa Western Community College is accredited by the Higher Learning Commission (HLC).

Student life 
IWCC hosts college/alternative radio station 89.7 The River, which serves the entire Omaha metropolitan area.

IWCC offers Air Force ROTC through a cross-town agreement with the University of Nebraska-Omaha, the site of the ROTC classes.

Athletics 
Iowa Western's sports teams are nicknamed the Reivers. Men's sports include baseball, basketball, soccer, wrestling, cross country, golf, shotgun sports, track & field, bowling and football. Women's sports include basketball, softball, soccer, bowling, cross country, golf, shotgun sports, track & field, and volleyball. Co-ed sports include cross country, track & field, cheerleading and golf. Reiver athletics also include cheer-leading and a dance team nicknamed the Sapphires.

Iowa Western is a Division 1 school in the National Junior College Athletic Association (NJCAA) and the Iowa Community College Athletic Conference (ICCAC). The men and women have 7 NJCAA National Championships between them. The men's National Championships were in football (2012), baseball (2010, 2012, 2014), and soccer (2013). The women's National Championships were in volleyball (2006) and soccer (2013). In addition to the NJCAA National Championships, the cheer-leading squad won the 2016 World University Championships.

Notable people 

Geronimo Allison, professional football player
Darrick Minner, professional MMA fighter
Ron Boone, Professional basketball player and announcer
Mark Brandenburg and Greg Forristall are Iowa State Representatives for the 15th and 22nd District respectively.
Nick Easley, professional football player
Don Jackson, professional football player
Isaiah Johnson, professional football player
Erik Swanson, professional baseball player
Derwin Kitchen (born 1986), professional basketball player
 Xavier Munford (born 1992), basketball player for Hapoel Tel Aviv of the Israeli Basketball Premier League
Michael S. Sanchez, attorney and politician who served in the New Mexico Senate
Tom Shipley, politician who serves in the Iowa Senate
Jake Waters, former professional football player and college football coach
Perrion Winfrey, professional football player

References

External links

 
Buildings and structures in Council Bluffs, Iowa
Education in Pottawattamie County, Iowa
Educational institutions established in 1967
Community colleges in Iowa
NJCAA athletics